Marion Gunstveit Bojanowski (born 16 May 1966) is a Norwegian politician for the Christian Democratic Party.

She served as a deputy representative to the Parliament of Norway from Aust-Agder during the term 2009–2013. She represents Grimstad.

References

1966 births
Living people
Deputy members of the Storting
Christian Democratic Party (Norway) politicians
Aust-Agder politicians
People from Grimstad
Women members of the Storting
Place of birth missing (living people)